WPGY (1580 AM) is a radio station broadcasting an oldies format. It licensed to Ellijay, Georgia, United States, and is owned by Randy Gravley and Byron Dobbs, through licensee Tri-State Communications, Inc. It features programming from AP Radio.

History
The station went on the air as WLJA on May 14, 1986. On December 1, 1999, the station changed its call sign to the current WPGY.

Translator

Previous logo

References

External links

PGY
Radio stations established in 1978
1978 establishments in Georgia (U.S. state)
PGY